Yang Chin-min (born 22 January 1984) is a Taiwanese professional basketball player who plays for the New Taipei Kings of the P. League+. He formerly played for the Taiwan Beer of the Super Basketball League. Yang also plays for the Chinese Taipei national basketball team and made his national team debut at the FIBA Asia Championship 2009.

Yang played primarily off the bench for the Chinese Taipei team at the 2009 Asian Championship.  In his most extensive action of the tournament, he scored a game-high of 24 points in Chinese Taipei's preliminary round victory over Kuwait.  He also scored a team-high 19 points in Chinese Taipei's 87-79 victory over Qatar in the fifth-place game.

References

1984 births
Living people
New Taipei Kings players
Shanghai Sharks players
Taiwanese men's basketball players
Basketball players at the 2006 Asian Games
Basketball players at the 2010 Asian Games
Basketball players at the 2014 Asian Games
Taiwanese expatriate basketball people in China
Asian Games competitors for Chinese Taipei
Shooting guards
Formosa Dreamers players
Formosa Taishin Dreamers players
Chinese Taipei men's national basketball team players
Bank of Taiwan basketball players
Taiwan Beer basketball players
Shanxi Loongs players
Xinjiang Flying Tigers players
Beijing Royal Fighters players
Super Basketball League players
P. League+ players